Brentonico (Brentònec in local dialect) is a comune (municipality) in Trentino in the northern Italian region Trentino-Alto Adige, located about  southwest of Trento.

Brentonico borders the following municipalities: Mori, Nago-Torbole, Malcesine, Ala, and Avio.

Demographic evolution

References

External links
 Homepage of the city

Cities and towns in Trentino-Alto Adige/Südtirol